Quechua (/ˈkɛtʃᵊwə/, /ˈkɛtʃuːə/ or /ˈkɛtʃwɑː/; Spanish pronunciation: [ˈketʃwa]) is the trademarked French brand for the hiking and camping apparel and equipment marketed mostly by French company Decathlon, the largest sporting goods retailer in the world with over 1,647 stores in nearly 1,000 cities in 57 countries and regions (January 2020).

Created as a brand in 1997 in Domancy, France, by a group of nine Decathlon employees, the group launched its first products in the spring of 1998 in all Decathlon stores, geared toward hikers and campers. The brand's design center is in Sallanches, near Mont Blanc. Its name derives from the indigenous Quechua people of the Andes and their language.

Timeline 

 1997: The Quechua company started in Sallanches. The trademark was registered officially, worldwide.
 1999: Opening of the International Headquarters in Domancy, near Mont Blanc.
 2002: The first Technical Partnership contracts were signed.
 2003: The six-year-old Quechua company joined the top 10 largest global brands in mountain gear. Publication of the first consumer magazine, covering mountain topics, called Chullanka ('snowed summit' in the Quechua language). The name changed to Quechua Magazine for the seventh issue.
 2006: Quechua won two IF Design Awards. The 2seconds tent won the Industrial Design Excellence Awards (IDEA) for the innovation of instant tent.
 2007: At the 10-year mark, the company employed 100 persons at its premises in Domancy. Quechua won three IF Design Awards for the Forclaz 900 jacket, Arpenaz 700 lady shoes and the 2seconds Air tent;
 2008: Quechua won three IF Design Awards for the "All in One Sleeping Bag", the SSV Forclaz and the Bionassay 500 jacket.

Technical partnership 
Quechua has partnerships with groups such as mountain guides, national team of young mountaineers and the Ifremmont Institute of Mountain Medical Research. It works with advisers in hiking (Hélène Rochas, Grégory Vollet, Vincent Delebarre, Dachhiri Sherpa), climbing (David Caude) and adventure racing (Quechua Team).

References

External links 

 Official website
 Official blog

Decathlon Group
French brands
Sportswear brands
Store brands
Sporting goods brands
Shoe companies of France
Clothing brands of France
Clothing companies established in 1997
Camping equipment manufacturers